RMS later SS Carthage was a Royal Mail Ship and ocean liner of the Peninsular and Oriental Steam Navigation Company. Known as one of the "Far East Sisters", she was launched in 1931 to serve the company's India and Far East Mail Service, along with her sister ship, . Both ships were built by Alexander Stephen & Sons Ltd in Glasgow, Scotland and served from 1931 until 1961 when they were scrapped.

War service
In January 1940 Carthage was converted to an armed merchant cruiser, flag number F99, fitted with eight six-inch guns in single mountings and two three-inch anti-aircraft guns. In 1943 she was disarmed and re-commissioned as a troopship.

References

1931 ships
Ocean liners
Passenger ships of the United Kingdom
Ships of P&O (company)
Steamships of the United Kingdom
World War II Auxiliary cruisers of the Royal Navy